Coomer may refer to:

People
 Cynara Coomer, Zimbabwean surgeon
 James C. Coomer (born 1939), American political scientist 
 Joe Coomer (American football) (1917–1979), American football player
 Joe Coomer (author) (born 1958), American author
 Ken Coomer, American drummer
 Ron Coomer (born 1966), American baseball player
 Sven Coomer (born 1940), Australian pentathlete

Places
 Coomer, Wisconsin, US

Other
 Coomer, an internet meme satirizing pornography addicts